Freedom from Despair is a 2004 documentary by Croatian-American director Brenda Brkusic about the Croatian struggle against communism in Yugoslavia.

The film was narrated by John Savage. Voiceovers were provided by actors Michael York and Beata Pozniak. Among those interviewed for the film were U.S. congressmen George Radanovich and Dennis Kucinich, both of Croatian background. The Croatian actor Petar Cvirn is also in this movie.

The film won awards for best documentary at the New York International Independent Film and Video Festival and the International Student Film Festival Hollywood, as well as Viewer's Voice Award at the Cinequest Film Festival.

References

External links
Official site
 

Croatian-language films
Films critical of communism
2000s English-language films
American documentary films about politics
Croatian documentary films
2000s American films